Academy of Military Science may refer to:

Academy of Military Sciences (China), the top Chinese military research institute
Academy of Military Science (United States), an officer commissioning program of the US Air Force
Academy of Military Science (Russia),  a military non-government institute in Russia
Venezuelan Academy of Military Sciences, a military academy in Venezuela